Omar Andrés Rodríguez Martínez (born March 4, 1981) is a retired Colombian  football midfielder.

Club career
Rodríguez is a product of the Millonarios youth system and has played with the Millonarios first team since January 2001.

He was released by FC Pune City due to his kidney problems.

Statistics (Official games/Colombian Ligue and Colombian Cup)
(As of November 14, 2011)

References

External links

1981 births
Living people
Colombian footballers
Millonarios F.C. players
S.D. Aucas footballers
Academia F.C. players
Deportivo Pasto footballers
Once Caldas footballers
FC Pune City players
Colombian expatriate footballers
Expatriate footballers in Ecuador
Expatriate footballers in India
Association football midfielders
Footballers from Bogotá
Colombian expatriate sportspeople in India